Reinhard Todt (born 22 January 1949) is an Austrian politician and since 2001 a member to the Federal Council from Vienna. He was President of the Federal Council from 1 July 2013 to 31 December 2013 and from 1 January 2018 to 30 June 2018.

References 

1949 births
Presidents of the Austrian Federal Council
Members of the Federal Council (Austria)
Politicians from Vienna
Recipients of the Decoration for Services to the Republic of Austria
Social Democratic Party of Austria politicians
Living people